Out of Control is a 1985  American-Yugoslav action-drama film directed  by Allan Holzman and starring Martin Hewitt, Andrew J. Lederer and Betsy Russell.

Plot 
After graduation eight teens fly a seaplane to a private island, bad weather causes the plane to crash. They end up on a deserted island, but they are not alone and must fight drug smugglers in order to survive.

Cast 
 
 Martin Hewitt as Keith Toland 
 Andrew J. Lederer as Elliot
 Betsy Russell as Chrissie Baret
 Claudia Udy as Tina
  Cindi Dietrich as Robin
 Richard Kantor as Gary
 Sherilyn Fenn as Katie
 Jim Youngs as Cowboy
  Pavle Balenovic  as Pete

References

External links 

1980s action drama films
Dimension Films films
American action drama films
1985 drama films
1985 films
1980s English-language films
1980s American films